The Ghana national badminton team represents Ghana in international badminton team competitions. The Badminton Association of Ghana is the national governing body of the sport representing every member of the Badminton community in Ghana. Providing a well-governed, compliant, and inclusive global sport and at the government level, ensuring as many policies and players as possible can return to Badminton awareness and its benefits for mote than 59 Community Clubs and 14.8 Million fun, casual and elite players in increasing the number of facilities and courts nationwide 

The Ghanaian team participates in the All Africa Men's and Women's Team Badminton Championships, formerly known as the Thomas & Uber Cups Preliminaries for Africa.

The Ghanaian men's team reached the semifinals in 1982, 2016 and 2018 while the women's team were runners-up in the 1982 edition of the championships. The mixed team were semifinalists in 1982 and 2019 in Port Harcourt, Nigeria.

Participation in Commonwealth Games 
The Ghana badminton mixed team debuted in the 2014 Commonwealth Games in Glasgow. The team would later qualify for a second time and compete for a second time in 2018.

Mixed team

Participation in African Badminton Championships

Men's team

Mixed team

Participation in Africa Games

Current squad 

Men
Abraham Ayittey
Aaron Tamakloe
Daniel Sam
Emmanuel Botwe
Emmanuel Yaw Donkor
Michael Baah

Women
Stella Koteikai Amasah
Eunice Abena Arthur
Grace Annabel Atipaka
Gifty Mensah
Eyram Yaa Migbodzi

References 

Badminton
National badminton teams
Badminton in Ghana